Anthony Fitzgerald "Tony" Elliott (born January 10, 1964) is a former defensive back in the National Football League. He was a member of the Green Bay Packers during the 1987 NFL season.

Tony was a star player at Central Michigan University and was being scouted by multiple professional teams including the Dallas Cowboys.  Tony had every reason to look forward to a successful professional career, and his only dream was to make enough money to buy his mother a new house, outside of Detroit.

Unfortunately, during the spring scrimmage of his senior year, Tony went down on the field.  He had not been hit and his friends in the stands were confused when he was driven off the field and to the locker room. Tony's Achilles tendon had snapped, and he was taken to Central Michigan Community Hospital for surgery that night.  This was a career-altering injury as he was unable to regain his speed and was not drafted.

During the NFL player strike of 1987, Tony was able to sign on with the Green Bay Packers, but then suffered a knee injury.

References

Players of American football from Detroit
Green Bay Packers players
American football defensive backs
Central Michigan Chippewas football players
1964 births
Living people